Kızılcaören can refer to the following villages in Turkey:

 Kızılcaören, Çanakkale
 Kızılcaören, Hamamözü
 Kızılcaören, Kıbrıscık
 Kızılcaören, Kızılcahamam
 Kızılcaören, Taşköprü
 Kızılcaören, Vezirköprü